is a Japanese actor from Tokyo who has starred the movies Detroit Metal City (2008) and Ooku (2010). He was once affiliated to the talent agency Stardust Promotion under his stage name Yoshihiko Hosoda (though his first name is written in hiragana ), but left in October 2013. He is currently affiliated with Alpha Agency under his real name.

Television series

Movies
 Hatsu Kare (2006)
 Akane Zora (2007)
 Detroit Metal City (2008)
 Tea Fight (2008)
 Clearness (2008)
 I Give My First Love to You (2009)
 Ōoku: The Inner Chambers (2010)
 A Terminal Trust (2012)
 Musashi (2019), Miyamoto Musashi
 21st Century Girl (2019)
 Peer (2019), Masato
 Labyrinth of Cinema (2020)
 Love of a Brute (2022)
 Nukero Moebius! (2023)
 Spring in Between (2023)

References

External links

Japanese male film actors
1988 births
Living people
Japanese male models